Qasemabad (also Romanized as Qāsemābād) is a city in Jolgeh Zozan District, in Khaf County, Razavi Khorasan Province, Iran. At the 2006 census, its population was 4,022, in 850 families.

References 

Populated places in Khaf County
Cities in Razavi Khorasan Province